The Boltzmann constant ( or ) is the proportionality factor that relates the average relative thermal energy of particles in a gas with the thermodynamic temperature of the gas. It occurs in the definitions of the kelvin and the gas constant, and in Planck's law of black-body radiation and Boltzmann's entropy formula, and is used in calculating thermal noise in resistors. The Boltzmann constant has dimensions of energy divided by temperature, the same as entropy.  It is named after the Austrian scientist Ludwig Boltzmann.

As part of the 2019 redefinition of SI base units, the Boltzmann constant is one of the seven "defining constants" that have been given exact definitions. They are used in various combinations to define the seven SI base units. The Boltzmann constant is defined to be exactly .

Roles of the Boltzmann constant 

Macroscopically, the ideal gas law states that, for an ideal gas, the product of pressure  and volume  is proportional to the product of amount of substance  (in moles) and absolute temperature :
 
where  is the molar gas constant. Introducing the Boltzmann constant as the gas constant per molecule  transforms the ideal gas law into an alternative form:
 
where  is the number of molecules of gas.

Role in the equipartition of energy 

This is generally true only for classical systems with a large number of particles, and in which quantum effects are negligible.

In classical statistical mechanics, this average is predicted to hold exactly for homogeneous ideal gases. Monatomic ideal gases (the six noble gases) possess three degrees of freedom per atom, corresponding to the three spatial directions. This corresponds very well with experimental data. The thermal energy can be used to calculate the root-mean-square speed of the atoms, which turns out to be inversely proportional to the square root of the atomic mass.

Kinetic theory gives the average pressure  for an ideal gas as
 
Combination with the ideal gas law
 
shows that the average translational kinetic energy is
 
Considering that the translational motion velocity vector  has three degrees of freedom (one for each dimension) gives the average energy per degree of freedom equal to one third of that, i.e. .

The ideal gas equation is also obeyed closely by molecular gases; but the form for the heat capacity is more complicated, because the molecules possess additional internal degrees of freedom, as well as the three degrees of freedom for movement of the molecule as a whole. Diatomic gases, for example, possess a total of six degrees of simple freedom per molecule that are related to atomic motion (three translational, two rotational, and one vibrational). At lower temperatures, not all these degrees of freedom may fully participate in the gas heat capacity, due to quantum mechanical limits on the availability of excited states at the relevant thermal energy per molecule.

Role in Boltzmann factors 
More generally, systems in equilibrium at temperature  have probability  of occupying a state  with energy  weighted by the corresponding Boltzmann factor:

where  is the partition function. Again, it is the energy-like quantity  that takes central importance.

Consequences of this include (in addition to the results for ideal gases above) the Arrhenius equation in chemical kinetics.

Role in the statistical definition of entropy 

This equation, which relates the microscopic details, or microstates, of the system (via ) to its macroscopic state (via the entropy ), is the central idea of statistical mechanics. Such is its importance that it is inscribed on Boltzmann's tombstone.

The constant of proportionality  serves to make the statistical mechanical entropy equal to the classical thermodynamic entropy of Clausius:
 

One could choose instead a rescaled dimensionless entropy in microscopic terms such that
 

This is a more natural form and this rescaled entropy exactly corresponds to Shannon's subsequent information entropy.

The characteristic energy  is thus the energy required to increase the rescaled entropy by one nat.

The thermal voltage 

The thermal voltage depends on absolute temperature  as

where  is the magnitude of the electrical charge on the electron with a value  Equivalently,

The thermal voltage is also important in plasmas and electrolyte solutions (e.g. the Nernst equation); in both cases it provides a measure of how much the spatial distribution of electrons or ions is affected by a boundary held at a fixed voltage.

History 
The Boltzmann constant is named after its 19th century Austrian discoverer, Ludwig Boltzmann. Although Boltzmann first linked entropy and probability in 1877, the relation was never expressed with a specific constant until Max Planck first introduced , and gave a more precise value for it (about 2.5% lower than today's figure), in his derivation of the law of black-body radiation in 1900–1901. Before 1900, equations involving Boltzmann factors were not written using the energies per molecule and the Boltzmann constant, but rather using a form of the gas constant , and macroscopic energies for macroscopic quantities of the substance. The iconic terse form of the equation  on Boltzmann's tombstone is in fact due to Planck, not Boltzmann. Planck actually introduced it in the same work as his eponymous .

In 1920, Planck wrote in his Nobel Prize lecture:

This "peculiar state of affairs" is illustrated by reference to one of the great scientific debates of the time. There was considerable disagreement in the second half of the nineteenth century as to whether atoms and molecules were real or whether they were simply a heuristic tool for solving problems. There was no agreement whether chemical molecules, as measured by atomic weights, were the same as physical molecules, as measured by kinetic theory. Planck's 1920 lecture continued:

In versions of SI prior to the 2019 redefinition of the SI base units, the Boltzmann constant was a measured quantity rather than a fixed value. Its exact definition also varied over the years due to redefinitions of the kelvin (see ) and other SI base units (see ).

In 2017, the most accurate measures of the Boltzmann constant were obtained by acoustic gas thermometry, which determines the speed of sound of a monatomic gas in a triaxial ellipsoid chamber using microwave and acoustic resonances. This decade-long effort was undertaken with different techniques by several laboratories; it is one of the cornerstones of the 2019 redefinition of SI base units. Based on these measurements, the CODATA recommended  to be the final fixed value of the Boltzmann constant to be used for the International System of Units.

Value in different units 

Since  is a proportionality factor between temperature and energy, its numerical value depends on the choice of units for energy and temperature. The small numerical value of the Boltzmann constant in SI units means a change in temperature by 1 K only changes a particle's energy by a small amount. The characteristic energy  is a term encountered in many physical relationships.

The ratio of these two temperatures,  /  ≈ 1.239842, is the numerical value of hc in units of eV⋅μm.

Natural units 
The Boltzmann constant provides a mapping from the characteristic microscopic energy  to the macroscopic temperature scale . In fundamental physics, this mapping is often simplified by using the natural units of setting  to unity. This convention means that temperature and energy quantities have the same dimensions. With this convention, temperature is always given in units of energy, and the Boltzmann constant is not explicitly needed in formulas.

This convention simplifies many physical relationships and formulas. For example, the equipartition formula for the energy associated with each classical degree of freedom ( above) becomes
 
As another example, the definition of thermodynamic entropy coincides with the form of information entropy:
 
where  is the probability of each microstate.

See also 
 CODATA 2018
 Thermodynamic beta
 List of scientists whose names are used in physical constants

Notes

References

External links 
 Draft Chapter 2 for SI Brochure, following redefinitions of the base units (prepared by the Consultative Committee for Units)
 Big step towards redefining the kelvin: Scientists find new way to determine Boltzmann constant

Constant
Fundamental constants
Statistical mechanics
Thermodynamics